Derio is a railway station in Derio, Basque Country, Spain. It is owned by Euskal Trenbide Sarea and operated by Euskotren. It lies on the Txorierri line.

History 
The station was opened together with the Txorierri line in 1894. In 1994, a new station was built a few hundred meters to the east, and the old station building was abandoned. The original station building had been tentatively listed for preservation in 2014, but was ultimately demolished in 2019.

The station was renovated between 2018 and 2020 after trains on the Txorierri line started running through metro line 3.

Services 

The station is served by Euskotren Trena line E3. It runs every 15 minutes (in each direction) during weekdays, and every 30 minutes during weekends.

References

External links
 

Euskotren Trena stations
Railway stations in Biscay
Railway stations in Spain opened in 1894